Warfare Noise is a split heavy metal album released on Cogumelo Records in 1986. The album features four Brazilian heavy metal bands: Chakal, Mutilator, Sarcófago, and Holocausto. A follow-up album titled Warfare Noise II was also released through Cogumelo Records in 1988. The record served as the debut for Sarcófago, and their appearance on the album ultimately led to them being signed to Cogumelo - their first label. In 2006, a one-off concert featuring Sarcófago was organized by Cogumelo and bass player Geraldo Minelli in celebration of the album's 20th anniversary.

Track listing

Personnel
Chakal
 Willian Wizdrums
 Markguitar
 Vladimir Korgvocals
 Destroyerbass

Mutilator
 Alexander "Magoo"lead guitar
 Kleberrhythm guitar
 Ricardo Nevesbass
 Rodrigo Nevesdrums
 Silvio SDNvocals

Sarcófago
 Wagner Moura Lamouniervocals
 Geraldo "Gerald Incubus" Minellibass
 Zéder "Butcher"guitar
 Armando "Leprous" Sampaiodrums

Holocausto
 Valério "Exterminator"guitar
 Anderson "Guerrilheiro"bass
 Nedson "Warfare"drums
 Rodrigo "Führer"vocals

Production
Ibsenartwork
Tarso Senraengineering
Patti Creusa Pereira De Fariaphotography

References

External links

Split albums
Black metal albums by Brazilian artists
Death metal albums by Brazilian artists
Thrash metal albums by Brazilian artists
1986 albums